The 1994 Winter Olympics, officially known as the XVII Winter Olympics, were a winter multi-sport event held in Lillehammer, Norway, from February 12 to February 27, 1994. A total of 1,737 athletes representing 67 National Olympic Committees (NOCs) (+3 from 1992 Olympics) participated in 61 events (+4 from 1992), from 12 sports and disciplines (unchanged from 1992).  These were the only Winter Olympics held two years after the prior Games, as opposed to the four year separation before and after. Continuing the break from tradition of 1992, the medals were primarily made of granite rather than metal; gold, silver, or bronze was used only on the border, the Olympic rings, and a pictogram of the sport for which the medal was awarded.

Athletes from 22 countries won at least one medal, and athletes from 14 secured at least one gold medal.  The host Norwegians led the overall medal count with 26, and were second in gold medals with 10. Russia, in its first Winter Olympics after the fall of the Soviet Union, led in gold medals with 11, and was third in overall medals with 23.  The German team were second in overall medals with 24. Six nations won their first Winter Olympic medals: Australia, Belarus, Kazakhstan, Slovenia, Ukraine, and Uzbekistan. Three of these, Kazakhstan, Ukraine, and Uzbekistan, won their first Winter Olympic gold medals. The three first-time gold medalist nations and Belarus were all competing in their first Olympic Games as independent National Olympic Committees following the breakup of the Soviet Union.

Italian cross-country skier Manuela Di Centa led all athletes with five medals, two gold, two silver, and one bronze. Russian cross-country skier Lyubov Yegorova, after winning five medals two years prior in Albertville won four medals in Lillehammer.


Medal table

The medal table is based on information provided by the International Olympic Committee (IOC) and is consistent with IOC convention in its published medal tables. By default, the table is ordered by the number of gold medals the athletes from a nation have won, where nation is an entity represented by a National Olympic Committee (NOC). The number of silver medals is taken into consideration next and then the number of bronze medals. If nations are still tied, equal ranking is given and they are listed alphabetically.  Medals won in team competitions—such as ice hockey—are counted only once, no matter how many athletes won medals as part of the team.

See also
 1994 Winter Paralympics medal table

References

External links
 
 
 

Medal count
Winter Olympics medal tables